Review of Indonesia was an English-language monthly magazine published by the Communist Party of Indonesia (PKI). The magazine existed between 1954 and 1960. It was initially known as Monthly Review. It was launched in mid-1954. Monthly Review was mimeographed, but once it was relaunched as Review of Indonesia in January 1957 it was printed and illustrated.

References

1954 establishments in Indonesia
1960 disestablishments in Indonesia
Communist magazines
Communist Party of Indonesia
Defunct magazines published in Indonesia
Defunct political magazines
English-language magazines
Monthly magazines published in Indonesia
Political magazines published in Indonesia
Magazines established in 1954
Magazines disestablished in 1960